Rohan Kapoor (or Ruhan, born 1965) is a Hindi actor and singer, son of Mahendra Kapoor. He started his film career at the age of 16 as an assistant director with Manoj Kumar for the film Kranti. After that, he became active on the stage with Shafi Inamdar and even acted for two of his most popular plays - Neela Kamra and Adaa. Yash Chopra gave a break to Rohan as a hero in his film Faasle with Farha in the year 1985, then he had a role in Love 86, in which Govinda co-starred with Rohan. After that, Prakash Mehra got Rohan to play in Imaandaar in deference to his earlier role with Shafi Inamdar and Sanjay Dutt, which earned Rohan much critical acclaim from the media as well as moviegoers. Then, many other roles came, including Masti, Mera Naseeb, Maha Kali, and Sur Asur.

He also started his singing career at the age of nine; he toured the world with his father singing on stage. Then, Rohan made the pop albums Oh My Darling, Dil Tera Diwana and Ishq Rab Ki Dua.

Selected filmography

References 
Ruhan Kapoor's Biography on Audionetwork
Ruhan Kapoor BBC Artist page

External links

Ruhan Kapoor's performance-Times Content
Ruhan Kapoor pays tribute to legendary father
www.ruhankapoor.com
Ruhan Kapoor BBC Artists page
Interview of Ruhan Kapoor - Rediff

20th-century Indian male actors
Indian male singers
1965 births
Living people
Place of birth missing (living people)
Male actors in Hindi cinema
21st-century Indian male actors
Male actors from Mumbai